Victor Bockris (born 1949) is an English-born, U.S.-based author, primarily biographies of artists, writers, and musicians.

He has written about Lou Reed (and The Velvet Underground), Andy Warhol, Keith Richards, William S. Burroughs, Terry Southern, Blondie, Patti Smith, and Muhammad Ali. He also helped write the autobiographies of John Cale and Bebe Buell.

Bockris was born in Sussex, England in 1949; his family moved to Pennsylvania when he was four years old. He attended the British boarding school Rugby and Philadelphia's Central High School.  He graduated from the University of Pennsylvania, where he was a member of the Philomathean Society, with a BA in Literature in 1971. While still in Philadelphia, he founded Telegraph Books along with Andrew Wylie and Aram Saroyan.  He also published two books of his own poetry, In America and Victor Bockris.

He moved to New York City in 1973 to work with Andrew Wiley as a writing team called Bockris-Wiley.  They interviewed the 100 most intelligent people in the world according to them.  In 1974 they published Ali: Fighter, Poet, Prophet, which was the first study of Ali as a writer and a rapper.  Between 1977 and 1983 he worked with William Burroughs at his Bunker on the Bowery.  He also worked with Andy Warhol at the Factory and published many pieces in Warhol's magazine Interview. As well as Interview, Bockris also published work in High Times, Gadfly and Drummer.

Warhol wrote in his book Exposures [Andy Warhol Books/Grosset & Dunlap, A Filmways Company publishers, New York 1979], "Victor Bockris is a brilliant young writer who only writes about three people: William Burroughs, Muhammad Ali and me.  Victor Bockris has more energy than any person I know.  He types like Van Cliburn plays the piano.  He's always tape-recording and taking pictures.  I can't keep up with him."

Bockris' book Beat Punks explores the relationship between artistic bohemians of the 1950s (the Beats) and the 1970s (the Punks).  This is a theme he is developing in his memoir, In Search of the Magic Universe.

Quotes
"Andy taught us how to interview: Never have any questions ready. Treat it like a cocktail party."

References

External links
 Interview
 The Ali-Warhol tapes by Victor Bockris
 The magic world of William Burroughs by Victor Bockris
 Visions of the Seventies by Victor Bockris
 Telegraph Books collection, Kislak Center for Special Collections, Rare Books and Manuscripts, University of Pennsylvania
 Victor Bockris papers, Kislak Center for Special Collections, Rare Books and Manuscripts, University of Pennsylvania
 Victor Bockris and Andrew Wylie Collection at the Harry Ransom Center

1949 births
Living people
English biographers
English emigrants to the United States
University of Pennsylvania alumni